Paulo Josué Stürmer dos Reis (born 13 March 1989), commonly known as Paulo Josué, is a professional footballer who plays as a midfielder for Malaysia Super League club Kuala Lumpur City. He obtained Malaysian citizenship through naturalization.

Club career

Kuala Lumpur City

2017
On 2 June 2017, Paulo Josué joined Malaysia Premier League club Kuala Lumpur City during mid-season transfer.

He scored 6 goals from 9 league matches and helps the club to win the league as well as get promoted to the Malaysia Super League.

2018
Paulo Josué scored 7 goals during his Malaysia Super League debut. His contribution helps Kuala Lumpur maintain its super league team status.

2019
In the 2019 season, he did not manage to stop the club from being relegated as the club finished bottom of the table.

2020
For league season 2020, he is made the captain of the Kuala Lumpur team. A rare achievement for a foreign player.

2021
In 2021, Paulo Josue captained the team in the final of the Malaysia Cup. In the final game against the overwhelming favorite JDT, Kuala Lumpur City FC managed to beat the odds and win the game 2 - 0. Paulo scored the second goal to claim the cup.

Career statistics

Club

Honours
Kuala Lumpur City
 Malaysia Cup: 2021
 Malaysia Premier League: 2017
 AFC Cup runner-up: 2022

Individual
 AFC Cup top goalscorer: 2022

References

External links
 

1989 births
Living people
Sportspeople from Rio Grande do Sul
Brazilian footballers
Association football midfielders
Esporte Clube Juventude players
Clube Esportivo Bento Gonçalves players
Esporte Clube Passo Fundo players
Clube Esportivo Lajeadense players
Clube Atlético Votuporanguense players
Kuala Lumpur City F.C. players
Malaysia Super League players
Malaysia Premier League players
Brazilian expatriate footballers
Brazilian expatriate sportspeople in Malaysia
Expatriate footballers in Malaysia
Malaysian people of Brazilian descent